The 15th Annual Nickelodeon Kids' Choice Awards was held on April 20, 2002,  at Santa Monica Airport's Barker Hangar in Santa Monica, California. It was aired on Nickelodeon and hosted by Rosie O'Donnell for the seventh consecutive year.

The pilot for The Adventures of Jimmy Neutron, Boy Genius, "When Pants Attack", premiered after the ceremony as a special preview.

Presenters
Freddie Prinze Jr & Sarah Michelle Gellar Presented Favorite Movie
Romeo Miller & Melissa Joan Hart Presented Favorite Female Singer
Tony Hawk & Dave Mirra Presented Favorite Female Buttkicker
Mike Myers & Verne Troyer Presented Favorite Band
Bow Wow & Jessica Alba Presented Favorite Sports Team
Jennifer Love Hewitt Presented Usher
Frankie Muniz & Hilary Duff Presented Burp Contest
Alexa Vega & Antonio Banderas Presented Favorite TV Actor
Matt Damon Presented Wannabe Award
Will Smith Presented Favorite Male Singer
Mandy Moore & The Rock Presented Favorite TV Actress
Dana Carvey Introduced B2K with Rosie O'Donnell

Musical performers
B2K - "Uh Huh"
P!nk - "Get The Party Started"
Usher - "U Don't Have to Call"

Winners and nominees
Winners are listed first and in boldface.

Movies

Television

Music

Sports

Miscellaneous

Wannabe Award
Janet Jackson

Slimed celebrities
P!nk
Snowbell (Animated Segment)
Adam Sandler

References

External links 
 
 Kids Choice Awards 2002 Results

Nickelodeon Kids' Choice Awards
Kids' Choice Awards
Kids' Choice Awards
Kids' Choice Awards
Kids